
Gmina Nowy Staw is an urban-rural gmina (administrative district) in Malbork County, Pomeranian Voivodeship, in northern Poland.

Villages
In addition to the town of Nowy Staw, Gmina Nowy Staw contains the villages and settlements of Brzózki, Chlebówka, Dębina, Dybowo, Kącik, Krzewiny, Laski, Lipinka, Lubiszewo Drugie, Lubstowo, Martąg, Michałowo, Mirowo, Myszewo, Nidowo, Półmieście, Pręgowo Żuławskie, Stawiec, Świerki, Tralewo and Trępnowy.

Neighbouring gminas
Gmina Nowy Staw is bordered by the gminas of Lichnowy, Malbork, Nowy Dwór Gdański, Ostaszewo and Stare Pole.

References
Polish official population figures 2006

Nowy Staw
Malbork County